{{DISPLAYTITLE:C17H19NO4}}
The molecular formula C17H19NO4 may refer to:

 Fenoxycarb
 Haemanthamine
 Morphine-N-oxide (genomorphine)
 Noroxycodone
 Oxymorphone

Molecular formulas